Javier Sánchez Vicario (born 1 February 1968) is a former top-ten doubles professional tennis player from Spain. Sánchez won the US Open junior singles and doubles title in 1986, and reached the quarterfinal stage in the US Open men's singles event twice - in 1991 and 1996.

Career

Sánchez won the US Open junior singles and doubles title in 1986, partnering with Tomás Carbonell, and became world no. 1 junior that same year. 

In Javier's first career singles final in 1987 in Madrid, he faced his brother Emilio Sanchez. Emilio won the match in three sets. Emilio and Javier would play each other a total of 12 times during their careers, Emilio winning ten of their encounters and Javier winning two. They also partnered together to win three doubles titles.

Sanchez won his first professional doubles titles in 1987 and his first singles title in 1988 in Buenos Aires. His best grand slam performances included reaching the quarterfinals of the US Open in 1991 (defeating world no. 5 Sergi Bruguera) and 1996. Sanchez also reached the semifinals of the 1994 Hamburg Masters. He won a career total of four singles titles and 26 doubles titles, and reached a career-high ranking of no. 23 in singles (in 1994) and no. 9 in doubles (in 1992).

Personal life
Sánchez is a member of one of the world's most successful tennis families. His younger sister Arantxa Sánchez Vicario achieved the world no. 1 ranking in both singles and doubles, and won four Grand Slam singles titles; and his older brother Emilio Sánchez reached world no. 1 in doubles and won five Grand Slam doubles titles. They also have an older sister - Marisa - who also played professional tennis, peaking at world no. 368 in 1990.

Sanchez married his wife Isabel in September 1994. They have two daughters, Alba (born July 1998) and Julia (born March 2000).

In 2012, Arantxa Sánchez Vicario sued Javier Sanchez (and their father) for the alleged mishandling and embezzlement of her $60 million career earnings. The court case continued over three years, and in 2015 concluded in a private settlement.

Career finals

Doubles: 44 (26 wins, 18 losses)

Doubles performance timeline

Junior Grand Slam finals

Singles: 2 (1–1)

Doubles: 1 (1–0)

References

External links
 
 
 

Tennis players from Catalonia
People from Andorra la Vella
Sportspeople from Pamplona
Spanish expatriate sportspeople in Andorra
Spanish male tennis players
Tennis players at the 1988 Summer Olympics
US Open (tennis) junior champions
1968 births
Living people
Grand Slam (tennis) champions in boys' singles
Grand Slam (tennis) champions in boys' doubles
Olympic tennis players of Spain